Chung Dong-young (born 27 July 1953 in Sunchang County, North Jeolla) is a politician and was the United New Democratic Party nominee for President of South Korea in 2007.

From April 2004 until December 2005, Chung was the South Korean Minister of Unification. Before holding that post, he served two terms in the National Assembly with the National Congress for New Politics and the Millennium Democratic Party, respectively; has twice been chairman of the Uri Party; and was considered a strong contender to succeed Roh Moo-hyun as president. Like Roh, Chung is also a Roman Catholic.

He has a bachelor's degree in Korean History from Seoul National University (1979) and master's from the University of Wales, and before entering politics, he was a journalist and anchor at the Politics Section of the Munhwa Broadcasting Corporation. He served as an anchor at MBC Newsdesk from the late 1980s and early 1990s.

During his tenure as Unification Minister, Chung was a strong supporter of the Sunshine Policy. One of his uncontroversial achievements is the foundation of Kaesong Industrial Complex, which is an exclusive industrial zone set up on the southernmost province of North Korea, Keasong. The establishment of the complex, by allowing South Korean small and middle sized companies hiring cheap labors from North Korea brought synergetic effect on the South Korean economy. The complex is now reputed to have promoted peace on the Korean peninsula and to have served as "the bastion of peace" whenever the North and South relationship is strained. Some people criticize that he has not taken a tougher stance on North Korea, and that he had rhetorical clashes with the United States that helped weaken relations between the two countries. He was once accused of attempting to distract reporters from a meeting of activists for human rights in North Korea. However, some of the criticisms are biased by the one-sided political perspective from the people who support the hard-line approach to North Korea. The contention that he had impeded on the relationship between South Korea and the United States can be counter proven by the process he had made the Keasong Complex realized. The Keasong Complex could not have made possible unless the then Bush administer had authorized the approve of foreign materials flowing into North Korea. The realization of the complex in the middle of hawk driven period of "axis of evil" can only be correctly explained by the quick and wide approach by the then Unification Ministry and the minister Chung to convince the US government and the Korean counterpart.

In March 2007, while visiting the North Korean town of Kaesong where South Korean companies are set up, he proposed that an inter-Korean summit be organized there. However, since he had lost the presidential election that year, under the Lee Myung-bak government it never materialized.

On October 15, 2007, the United New Democratic Party announced that Chung won about 44 percent of the votes in the party primary, beating two other candidates, to become the party's candidate for the presidential elections that year.

Chung, however, lost the elections to the opposition's Grand National Party candidate Lee Myung-bak by the widest margin since direct elections began in 1987. The loss was attributed primarily to the people's disappointment of the economic situation and its dealings and continuous political strife under the Roh Mu-hyun government as well as the unsuccessful campaign strategies that overly relied on criticizing the other candidate, Lee Myung-bak. The issue of the presidential election in 2007 was predominantly about determining truth of the implication of the presidential candidate Lee Myung bak in the allegation of the investment advisory firm BBK ltd. which had then been accused of large scale stock price manipulation that hurt thousands of individual investors. The primary issue was to prove that he was the real owner of the company.

Lee strongly denied the claim even though there have been plenty of evidence he was at least closely related to the heads of the company and even there was a video tape showing he claiming himself to be the owner of the company. However, any hearings or legal trials of the case had not realized during the presidential election period and obviously after Lee become the president the case lost its force despite the wide public attention to it. Let alone the case, Lee Myung-bak was previously committed fourteen different cases of violations or crimes. However, the widespread perception of the people that the new president has to be the one who can efficiently control the economy has given him the strong edge over the opponent candidate. Evidently, the legitimacy of the president was an issue from the perspective of Chung and Chung's party. He stated that should the turnout for the presidential elections be under 50% that the legitimacy of the result may be an issue. However, the voter turnout was 62.9%.

Earlier, Chung also criticized opposition leader Park Geun-hye of the Grand National Party that they exploited the event to make an image that she is a victim to emotionally move the voters by immediately campaigning during that party's primaries after her recovery from an attack by a man who slashed her face with a small knife. Later, he attributed the downfall of his party in the poll to the attack.

Predictably, the Uri Party suffered a major defeat in the elections in which the opposition Grand National Party took 13 of the 16 provinces and major cities.

See also
Division of Korea
Politics of South Korea
2007 South Korean presidential election

Notes

External links

 Official website
"Uri Party leader quits following shocking local election defeat", Yonhap News, May 1, 2006.
"Front-runners trade barbs as leadership competition heats up", The Korea Herald, February 2, 2006.
Interview with OhmyNews 'I Will Work for an Inter-Korean Summit in 2005', December 6, 2004.
"Unification a Personal Struggle for Chung Dong-young", The Korea Times, May 30, 2004.
"Senior Citizens Demand Uri Party Chairman Quit Politics", The Korea Times, April 4, 2004.
"New Chairman Chung Dong-young of the Uri Party", The Dong-A Ilbo, January 11, 2004.

1953 births
Alumni of the University of Wales
Living people
South Korean diplomats
South Korean Roman Catholics
Government ministers of South Korea
United New Democratic Party politicians
Democratic Party (South Korea, 2000) politicians
Uri Party politicians
Members of the National Assembly (South Korea)